The 1938 United States House of Representatives elections in Virginia were held on November 8, 1938 to determine who would represent the Commonwealth of Virginia in the United States House of Representatives. Virginia had nine seats in the House, apportioned according to the 1930 United States Census. (Representatives are elected for two-year terms.)

Overview

References

See also
 1938 United States House of Representatives elections

Virginia
1938
1938 Virginia elections